Sancho Pança dans son isle is a 1762 opera by François-André Danican Philidor to a libretto by Antoine-Alexandre-Henri Poinsinet. It premiered at the Comédie Italienne on July 8, 1762.

Recording
Sancho Pança Opera Lafayette Naxos

References

1762 operas
Operas based on Don Quixote